Oldham Central Railway Station was opened on 1 November 1847 as part of the extension of the Middleton Junction to Oldham Werneth line to Oldham Mumps. It was eventually one of six stations in the town of Oldham and was adjacent to Clegg Street railway station which closed on 2 May 1959. Although Central was conveniently located close to the town centre it was selected for closure, shutting on 18 April 1966 and virtually no trace of it now remains. A factor in its closure may have been its relative closeness to the Werneth and Mumps stations.

The name of the station survives in the Oldham Central tram stop, which is located on Union Street.

References

Disused railway stations in the Metropolitan Borough of Oldham
Former Lancashire and Yorkshire Railway stations
Railway stations in Great Britain opened in 1847
Railway stations in Great Britain closed in 1966